Jadranka Pejanović  (19 January 1979 – 30 September 2018) was a Serbian actress and journalist. She worked on television channels N1 and B92.

Early life and career 
Jadranka Pejanovic was born in Belgrade on January 19, 1979 as Jadranka Bugarski. She finished the Philological Gymnasium. She graduated from the Academy of Arts in Belgrade, in the class of professor Branislav Jerinić. She has played in several theater performances, puppet theater, koreodrams, as well as several films and domestic series. From the puppet shows and theatrical roles, in 2008, she stepped into the world of television, in the newsroom TV B92. She led the show "Planet", then for several months she was the leader of the morning program "TV Dizanje" and reported from across the country all over Serbia, and then she went to the news program. She was co-author of the documentary film "Untold Stories", about the life of Zoran Djindjic. She has been working on N1 Television since its inception. In the editorial office of this television she designed the show "Scene", in which she followed events on the cultural scene of Serbia and the region. She was the author of the "Net Context", and she also featured the "New Day" show. She has done dozens of interviews with the most prominent figures of cultural and public life, she is the author of several documentary reports in the Unsourced series. During the floods in 2014 she reported to the US Si-En-En. She has been actively working with animated and featured films and studio studies for Studio, Gold Digi Net, Mobi, Ideogram, Saundlate, Wocaw and Bozomiks. She died on September 30, 2018, in Belgrade, at the age of 40.

Filmography

Serbian voice roles

References 

1979 births
2018 deaths
Actresses from Belgrade
Serbian women journalists
Journalists from Belgrade
Serbian voice actresses